Cheree Georgina Crowley (born 6 May 1988) is a New Zealand-born professional wrestler. She is currently signed to WWE, where she performs on the Raw brand under the ring name Dakota Kai. She is a member of Damage CTRL and a former two-time WWE Women's Tag Team Champion with Iyo Sky. She is also known for her time in NXT, where she won the inaugural Women's Dusty Rhodes Tag Team Classic, and is a former two-time NXT Women's Tag Team Champion.

Prior to her signing with WWE, Crowley wrestled under the ring name Evie, and appeared for Impact Pro Wrestling (IPW) in her native New Zealand, Pro Wrestling Women's Alliance (PWA) in Australia, American promotions Shimmer Women Athletes and Shine Wrestling, as well as Japanese promotions Pro Wrestling Zero1 and World Wonder Ring Stardom.

Professional wrestling career

New Zealand and Australian independent promotions (2007–2016) 
Crowley made her professional wrestling debut on 15 December 2007 for Auckland based company Impact Pro Wrestling under the ring name Evie, a reference to her favourite Pokémon, Eevee.

In September 2011, she debuted in Sydney, Australia-based Pro Wrestling Alliance Australia (PWA Australia) for their annual PWWA show, where defeating Kellie Skater. In August 2012, Evie became the first Impact Pro Wrestling NZ Women's Champion, defeating Britenay and Megan Fox in a triple threat match. A week later, she won the Interim PWWA Championship by defeating Jessie McKay in the finals. 

After Impact Pro Wrestling returned after a few months from folding in mid-2013, all the previous title holders were stripped of their championships. Evie won the IPW Women's Championship back in December 2013 and aligned herself with a new heel faction called 'The Investment'.

Evie began 2014 in Japan, working on a three-month contract awarded to her through Pro Wrestling Zero1, and becoming the first female to receive such a contract.

American independent promotions (2013–2016) 

Evie made her debut for the all-female American promotion Shimmer Women Athletes at Volume 53 on 6 April 2013, participating in a five-way match which she lost to Christina Von Eerie and also included Yuu Yamagata, Kalamity, and Rhia O'Reilly. At Volume 54, Evie defeated Kimber Lee to pick up her first win for the promotion, but she was defeated by Mia Yim the next day at Volume 56. She competed in a losing effort against Hikaru Shida at Shimmer Volume 62 in April 2014. At Volumes 63 and 64, Evie defeated Rhia O'Reilly and Nicole Matthews, respectively.

On 19 April 2013, Evie made her debut for Shine Wrestling at Shine 9, in a losing effort against Mercedes Martinez. At the Shine 18 iPPV on 20 April 2014, Evie and Skater lost to defending champions the Lucha Sisters (Leva Bates and Mia Yim) for the Shine Tag Team Championship.

World Wonder Ring Stardom (2015–2016) 
On 6 December 2015, Evie made her debut for the Japanese World Wonder Ring Stardom promotion. In her first match she won the vacant Artist of Stardom Championship alongside Hiroyo Matsumoto and Kellie Skater. They lost the title to Io Shirai, Kairi Hojo, and Mayu Iwatani in their third defense on 28 February 2016.

WWE

Early appearances (2015–2017)
Crowley appeared on the 14 October 2015 episode of NXT as Evie, losing to the debuting Nia Jax. On 15 December 2016, Crowley signed a contract with WWE, and a few months later she was announced as a participant in the upcoming Mae Young Classic under the new ring name Dakota Kai. According to Crowley, she wanted her new ring name to be something that sounded tomboyish but still reflected her Samoan heritage. The word Kai means sea in the Polynesian language, indicating her journey to get to WWE, and contrary to popular belief, is not a reference to Leilani Kai. Kai entered the tournament on 13 July, defeating Kavita Devi in the first round and Rhea Ripley in the second round, before being eliminated in the quarterfinals by Kairi Sane.

Beginnings in NXT (2017–2020)

On 25 October 2017 episode of NXT, Kai returned to television, competing in a women's battle royal won by Nikki Cross. On 10 January 2018 episode of NXT, Kai lost to the debuting Shayna Baszler by referee stoppage after Baszler stomped and injured her arm. After the match, Baszler attacked and locked her in the Kirifuda Clutch until NXT Women's Champion Ember Moon saved her. On 14 March episode of NXT, Kai scored her first televised victory, defeating Lacey Evans. Kai made her WrestleMania debut at WrestleMania 34 on 8 April, competing in the WrestleMania Women's Battle Royal and becoming the first female New Zealander to compete at WrestleMania. Kai also participated in a WrestleMania Axxess tournament which she won, earning herself a match for the NXT Women's Championship, but was defeated by newly crowned champion Shayna Baszler. In May, Kai earned another shot at the title but was unsuccessful in winning it. Throughout the rest of the year, Kai racked up victories and losses against competitors like Santana Garrett, Bianca Belair, Lacey Evans and Aliyah.

In parallel to her activities in NXT, Kai also appeared in the newly created NXT UK brand. At Evolution on 28 October, the first all women's pay-per-view, Kai unsuccessfully challenged Rhea Ripley (in a dark match) for the NXT UK Women's Championship. Before the match, Kai took part in a tournament (that was taped back in the summer but aired in November) for the vacant championship, defeating Nina Samuels in the first round but was eliminated in the semi-finals by eventual winner Ripley. After spending a few months away, Kai returned at NXT TakeOver: WarGames on 17 November, where she and Io Shirai helped Kairi Sane during her match with Shayna Baszler by attacking Baszler's allies Jessamyn Duke and Marina Shafir. On 17 January 2019, Kai announced on her Twitter page that she sustained a torn ACL, during an NXT live event in December, which would sideline her from in-ring competition for the next few months. Kai defeated Taynara Conti in her return match on 25 September episode of NXT. Shortly after, Kai's long-time tag team partner Tegan Nox returned to NXT and the two reunited their tag team dubbed "Team Kick". On 30 October episode of NXT, Team Kick unsuccessfully challenged The Kabuki Warriors (Asuka and Kairi Sane) for the WWE Women's Tag Team Championship.
In November, Kai made her main roster debut as part of the NXT talent that were placed in an invasion angle with Raw and SmackDown as part of the Survivor Series pay-per-view. Mia Yim was chosen over Kai as part of Rhea Ripley's team for the first-ever women's WarGames match against Shayna Baszler's team. On 23 November at NXT TakeOver: WarGames, just before the match took place, Kai replaced Yim, who was attacked backstage. However, before she entered the ring, Kai attacked her tag team partner, Tegan Nox, turning heel for the first time in her career. Upon her return in December, Mia Yim revealed that Kai attacked Yim backstage and this led to a grudge match between the two, which Kai won. On 26 January 2020, at Royal Rumble, Kai entered her first Royal Rumble match at #15, but was eliminated by Chelsea Green. On 29 January episode of NXT, Kai lost to Nox after she used a knee brace following a distraction from Candice LeRae.

Storyline with Raquel González (2020–2022)
Kai defeated Nox twice: first at NXT TakeOver: Portland in a street fight, and second in a steel cage match, both after interferences from González. On 7 June at TakeOver: In Your House, Kai, González and Candice LeRae lost to Nox, Mia Yim and Shotzi Blackheart. At NXT TakeOver XXX, she failed to win the Women's title against Io Shirai. Kai and González soon aligned with LeRae and Toni Storm, resulting in a WarGames match against Blackheart, Ember Moon, Shirai, and Ripley at WarGames on 6 December, which her team won. Kai and González won the first ever Women's Dusty Rhodes Tag Team Classic, when she defeated Blackheart and Moon in the finals at Vengeance Day. With this win, they earned a shot at WWE Women's Tag Team Champions Nia Jax and Shayna Baszler, a match that would end in controversy on 3 March episode of NXT, after Kai was submitted by Baszler despite not being the legal competitor in the match. The following week, they were awarded the newly created NXT Women's Tag Team Championship by General Manager William Regal, marking Kai's first championship in the WWE. However, the two lost the titles to Blackheart and Moon that night.

After González won the NXT Women's Championship at NXT TakeOver: Stand & Deliver on 7 April, tension began to show between the two as González began displaying more face tactics. On 27 July episode of NXT, Kai turned on González, ending their alliance. At NXT TakeOver 36 on 22 August, Kai unsuccessfully challenged González for the title.  On 26 October at Halloween Havoc, she returned as the mysterious person to cost González the title to Mandy Rose in a Trick or Street Fight. On 5 December at WarGames, Kai and Toxic Attraction (Gigi Dolin, Jacy Jayne, and Rose) lost to González, Shirai, Cora Jade, and Kay Lee Ray in a WarGames match. Kai then competed in the Women's Dusty Rhodes Tag Team Classic with Wendy Choo, defeating Indi Hartwell and Persia Pirotta in the first round, González and Jade in the semifinals on 8 March 2022 at Roadblock, but lost to Shirai and Kay Lee Ray in the finals. 

On 29 March episode of NXT, after Toxic Attraction took out Wendy Choo, Kai attacked the group and was assisted by a returning Raquel González, whom Kai embraced afterwards, turning face for the first time since 2019. It was then announced that Kai and González would face Toxic Attraction members Gigi Dolin and Jacy Jayne for the NXT Women's Tag Team Championship during the pre-show of NXT Stand & Deliver on 2 April, in which they were successful in winning the titles. Their first title defense was scheduled for the following episode of NXT, losing the titles back to Toxic Attraction due to Mandy Rose’s interference. The following week, Kai unsuccessfully challenged Rose for the NXT Women's Championship in what would be her final appearance in NXT.

On 29 April 2022, Kai was released from her WWE contract. She had reportedly expressed to the company that she was not planning on renewing her contract prior to her release.

Damage CTRL (2022–present) 

On 30 July 2022, Kai re-signed with WWE and returned at SummerSlam alongside Bayley and Iyo Sky (formerly known as Io Shirai). She officially joined the Raw brand as a heel and made her debut for the brand the following night. Throughout the summer, the trio became known as Damage CTRL and they started a feud with Bianca Belair, Alexa Bliss, and Asuka that led to various singles and tag team matches, with the most notable being a six-woman tag team match at Clash at the Castle, where Damage CTRL were victorious.

At the same time, Kai and Sky entered a tournament for the vacant WWE Women's Tag Team Championship. The two made it to the finals, where they lost to Aliyah and Raquel Rodriguez after Aliyah pinned Dakota even though she was not the legal competitor. This set up a rematch between the two teams, in which Kai and Sky defeated Aliyah and Rodriguez on the 12 September episode of Raw to win the Women's Tag Team Championship for the first time. Kai and Sky lost the titles on the 31 October episode of Raw to Bliss and Asuka and went on to regain them five days later Crown Jewel, which also marked the first time a women's championship changed hands in the Middle East. The rivalry between the two trios ended at Survivor Series WarGames on 26 November, where Damage CTRL, Rhea Ripley, and Nikki Cross lost to Belair, Asuka, Bliss, Mia Yim, and Becky Lynch in a WarGames match.

Kai then entered the women's Royal Rumble match at the titular event on 28 January 2023. She eliminated five wrestlers, four of which were done by her, Bayley, and Iyo Sky, before being eliminated by Becky Lynch.
On the February 27 episode of Raw. Kai and Sky lost titles to Lynch and Lita, ending their second reign at 114 days.

Other media 
In September 2009, Crowley starred in the music video for "Sweet December" by Auckland band These Four Walls. In the summer of 2013, as Evie, she was profiled on the Māori Television sports show Code.

As Dakota Kai, she is a playable character in the video games WWE 2K19, WWE 2K20, and WWE 2K22.

Crowley currently streams on Twitch under the username "Charliegirl".

Personal life 
Crowley is of Irish and Samoan descent. Her mother is originally from the Samoan village of Lepea on the island of Upolu. She has two younger siblings: her sister Nyrene is a mixed martial artist, and her brother Earl is a DJ. Her grandfather Pat Crowley represented New Zealand as a member of the All Blacks in 1949 and 1950.

Crowley is close friends with Shayna Baszler, Mia Yim, and Jessamyn Duke, and currently shares a house with Baszler in Florida.

Championships and accomplishments 
 Pro Wrestling Women's Alliance
 PWWA Championship (1 time)
 PWWA Interim Championship (1 time)
 PWWA Interim Championship Tournament (2012)
 Impact Pro Wrestling
 IPW Women's Championship (3 times)
 Pro Wrestling Illustrated
 Ranked No. 21 of the top 50 female wrestlers in the PWI Female 50 in 2016
 Shimmer Women Athletes
 Shimmer Tag Team Championship (1 time) – with Heidi Lovelace
 World Wonder Ring Stardom
 Artist of Stardom Championship (1 time) – with Hiroyo Matsumoto and Kellie Skater
 WWE
WWE Women's Tag Team Championship (2 times) – with Iyo Sky
 NXT Women's Tag Team Championship (2 times) – with Raquel González
 NXT Women's Championship Invitational (2018)
 Women's Dusty Rhodes Tag Team Classic (2021) – with Raquel González
 NXT Year-End Award (1 time)
 Future Star of NXT (2019)

References

External links

 
 
 
 

1988 births
Expatriate professional wrestlers
Living people
New Zealand expatriate sportspeople in the United States
New Zealand female professional wrestlers
New Zealand people of Irish descent
New Zealand sportspeople of Samoan descent
NXT Women's Tag Team Champions
Sportspeople from Auckland
Twitch (service) streamers
Women graphic designers
21st-century professional wrestlers
Artist of Stardom Champions
WWE Women's Tag Team Champions
Shimmer Tag Team Champions